The United States House of Representatives elections in California, 1930 was an election for California's delegation to the United States House of Representatives, which occurred as part of the general election of the House of Representatives on November 4, 1930. California's delegation remained unchanged at 10 Republicans and 1 Democrat.

Overview

Results
Final results from the Clerk of the House of Representatives:

District 1

District 2

District 3

District 4

District 5

District 6

District 7

District 8

District 9

District 10

District 11

See also
72nd United States Congress
Political party strength in California
Political party strength in U.S. states
1930 United States House of Representatives elections

References
California Elections Page
Office of the Clerk of the House of Representatives

External links
California Legislative District Maps (1911-Present)
RAND California Election Returns: District Definitions

1930 California elections
1930
California United States House of Representatives